Eat Wheaties! is a 2020 Canadian comedy film written and directed by Scott Abramovitch, and produced by Abramovitch and David J. Phillips.

Premise 
An adaptation of Michael Kun's 2003 novel The Locklear Letters updated for the social media era, the film stars Tony Hale as Sid Straw, a man who becomes co-chair of the University of Pennsylvania planning committee for his college reunion, only to become obsessed with proving that he was friends with actress Elizabeth Banks in their student days.

Cast

Release 
The film premiered on September 25, 2020 at the Calgary International Film Festival, and had its American premiere at the Heartland Film Festival in October 2020 where it was the Opening Night film and won the Humor And Humanity Award. It was subsequently screened at the 2020 San Diego International Film Festival, winning the Best Comedy Award, and the 2020 Whistler Film Festival, where Norman Wilner of Now wrote that "If any movie at this festival has a chance at cult status, it’s this one." It was released theatrically and on VOD in the United States on April 30, 2021 by Screen Media Films and won the Best Feature Film and People's Choice Best Feature Film awards at the 2022 Borrego Springs Film Festival  as well as the Best Feature Film, Humor/Satire at 2022's Filmfest Bremen.

Reception 
The film was positively reviewed by film critics, with a Rotten Tomatoes score of 68% and Lou Harry of the Midwest Film Journal writing "Eat Wheaties! is one of my favorite films this year. Honestly. It's got the cringe-laughs of a good episode of Curb Your Enthusiasm but with a sweet, gentle heart beating inside it." Gabriel Sigler of Bad Feeling wrote that "Eat Wheaties! is one of the most enjoyable films of the year." The critical consensus on Rotten Tomatoes reads, "It frequently fumbles its attempts to balance cringe comedy and sincere drama, but Tony Hale's charm helps keep Eat Wheaties! from getting soggy."

Richard Roeper's three star (out of four) review in the Chicago Sun Times noted "in the hands of writer-director Scott Abramovitch and with the considerable contributions of an outstanding cast that also includes Kylie Bunbury (“Big Sky”) and Paul Walter Hauser (“Richard Jewell”), “Eat Wheaties” is a dryly funny, even sweet and surprisingly touching story".

References

External links
 

2020 films
2020 comedy films
Canadian comedy films
English-language Canadian films
2020s English-language films
2020s Canadian films